HMS Halcyon was the lead ship in her class of minesweepers built for the Royal Navy in the 1930s. The vessel was launched on 20 December 1933 and was used as a convoy escort and during the landing operations during the Invasion of Normandy during  World War II. The ship was sold for scrapping in 1950.

Design and description
The Halcyon class designed as a replacement for the preceding  and varied in size and propulsion.

She was powered by two vertical compound-expansion steam engines, each driving one shaft, using steam provided by two Admiralty three-drum boilers. The ship's complement consisted of 80 officers and ratings.

Halcyon was armed with two QF 4-inch (10.2 cm) guns; the forward gun was in a high-angle mount while the aft gun was in a low-angle mount. She was also equipped with eight  machine guns. Later in her career, the rear 4-inch gun mount was removed as were most of the .303 machine guns, one quadruple mount for Vickers .50 machine guns was added as were up to four single or twin mounts for 20 mm Oerlikon anti-aircraft guns. For escort work, her minesweeping gear could be exchanged for around 40 depth charges.

Construction and career
Halcyon was built by John Brown Shipbuilding & Engineering Company Ltd., at Clydebank, in Scotland. She was laid down on 27 March 1933 and launched on 20 December of the same year. She was commissioned on 18 April 1934.

During the Second World War, Halcyon served as the lead ship in the 1st Minesweeper Flotilla and saw service during the Arctic convoys, including Convoy PQ 17 in 1942. She also saw service during Operation Neptune, the naval component of Operation Overlord (D-Day, 1944). Halcyon was sold for scrapping at Milford Haven on 19 April 1950 after 16 years service with the Royal Navy.

References

Bibliography

External links 
 HMS Halcyon (J.42) - uboat.net
 http://www.halcyon-class.co.uk/halcyon/hms_halcyon.htm

 

Halcyon-class minesweepers
Ships built on the River Clyde
1933 ships
World War II minesweepers of the United Kingdom
Cold War minesweepers of the United Kingdom